Low Row is a former railway station on the Tyne Valley Line, which served the village of Low Row in Cumbria between 1836 and 1965.

History 
The station was opened on 20 July 1836 by the Newcastle and Carlisle Railway. The station was closed to passengers on 5 January 1959 and closed completely in 1965.

References

External links 

Disused railway stations in Cumbria
Former North Eastern Railway (UK) stations
Railway stations in Great Britain opened in 1836
Railway stations in Great Britain closed in 1959
1836 establishments in England
1965 disestablishments in England